Molokai Ka Hula Piko is an annual festival of the hula, held for three days every spring in Kaana, Molokai. Ka Hula Piko in Hawaiian means the "center of the hula dance".

History 
The first festival was in 1991 by the Molokai Visitors Association and John Kaimikaua, a Kumu Hula. It is currently organized by the Halau Hula o Kukunaokala.

It is held in annually in Kaana because according to Hawaiian legend, Laka, now regarded as the goddess of hula, created hula at Pu'u Nana, a sacred hill in Kaana, before spreading the art form across the islands.

This festival went on hiatus in 2020.

Festival 
The festival begins with an early-morning ceremony at Puʻu Nana. It then continues with a ho'olaule'a, lectures, and other activities intended to educate and spread awareness of hula as an art form.

See also 

 Merrie Monarch Festival

References

External links 
 Official site

Hawaiian music
Hawaii culture
Molokai
Festivals in Hawaii
Tourist attractions in Maui County, Hawaii
Dance festivals in the United States
1991 establishments in Hawaii
Recurring events established in 1991
Dance in Hawaii
Native American festivals
Hula